Cochin ware or Kochi ware or Jiaozhi ware is a type of Vietnamese pottery from Northern Province, Vietnam.

History 
Koji pottery was brought to Taiwan in the 19th century.

The English term "Cochin" derives from the Taiwanese pronunciation Jiāozhǐ, which was used to denote Vietnam (Vietnamese: Giao-chỉ). The region of Cochinchina is an example of the term.

At that time, Cochin ware consisted mainly of decorations for the walls and roof ridges of temples, including human figures, animals, birds, and flowers in bright, glossy colors. Today, there are only a handful of craftspeople who still possess the traditional Cochin skills, most of whom are in the central-island city of Chiayi.

Japan 
In Japan it is known as Kōchi ware (Kōchi-yaki). In the old capital city Kyoto the masters of the tea ceremony esteem Kōchi ware as small figures of animals, fish, flowers, dragons, the phoenix etc. Initially imported as shimamono, it became a part of Japanese pottery. The Koshun kiln is also a production centre in Kyoto.

References

External links

  Pottery and Porcelain
   Chiayi City Koji Pottery Museum
 A Handbook of Chinese Ceramics from The Metropolitan Museum of Art

Chinese pottery
Japanese pottery
Arts in Taiwan
Cantonese folk art
Traditional Chinese architecture